Darío Gabriel Sztajnszrajber (/shtainshráiber/, Buenos Aires, Argentina;, 16 June  1968  is a Hispanophone philosopher, essayist, teacher, and television presenter. An agnostic of Jewish extraction he is also the brother of Argentinian journalist Mauro Szeta, a specialist in police matters.

He has been a teacher at all educational levels including primary, secondary, university and postgraduate studies in philosophy at the Latin American Social Sciences Institute and the undergraduate level at the University of Buenos Aires.

Sztajnszrajber has developed an instructive body of work in philosophy widely read throughout the Spanish speaking world  for which he earned a dissemination award from the Konex Foundation in 2017.  he also hosts an Argentinian TV talk program on Canal Encuentro  entitled Lying about the truth.  He is also an occasional presenter or consultant  on philosophical content of radio programs, academic graphic presentations on TV and some theatrical performances.

References

	

Argentine philosophers
1968 births
Living people
People from Buenos Aires